Pindos or Pindus, also called Acyphas or Akyphas, was an ancient city and polis (city-state) of Greece, one of the towns of the tetrapolis of Doris, situated upon a river of the same name, which flows into the Cephissus near Lilaea. Strabo, Theopompus, and Stephanus of Byzantium call the city Akyphas. In one passage Strabo says that Pindus lay above Erineus, and in another he places it in the district of Oetaea; it is, therefore, probable that the town stood in the upper part of the valley, near the sources of the river in the mountain.

References

External links
STOA

Populated places in ancient Doris
Former populated places in Greece
Ancient Greek cities
Cities in ancient Greece
Dorian city-states